Heaven's Fire is a 1999 action television film starring Eric Roberts and Jürgen Prochnow, that aired on Fox Family Channel.

Plot
The story involves a group of would-be burglars who attempt a daring daylight robbery of a Federal Building in Seattle, Washington.  However, the criminals are forced to improvise when their getaway helicopter crashes and sets a deadly fire in the building.  Also in the building is a former security guard (Eric Roberts) who is the only person who can stop the heist and save the innocent bystanders who are trapped in the burning building.

Reception
TV Guide said, "If you enjoy hogwash about trapped victims in tall buildings, then this will satisfy your sub-DIE HARD cravings."  Radio Times rated it 2 stars saying, "Two plots for the price of one, and neither is much good."

See also
List of firefighting films

References

External links

1999 films
1999 action films
Films about firefighting
Saban Entertainment films
American action television films
1990s English-language films
1990s American films